Sevappa Nayak was a governor of Thanjavur under the Vijayanagar Empire  who later proclaimed his independence and founded the Thanjavur Nayak kingdom. He reigned from 1532 to 1560.

Ancestry and personal life

Sevappa was the successor of his father was a Thimappa Nayak (Or) called Thimmabuban. The family hailed from Nedungundram near Thiruvannamalai. 

Sevappa is also Worked as to be a  Vaasal Karar of the Vijayanagar Emperor, Achyuta Deva Raya, the younger brother of Krishnadeva Raya for the Telugu histories Tanjavuri Andhra Rajula Charitramu and Tanjavuri Vari Charitram claim that Sevappa got Thanjavur as stri-danaor dowry. However, this opinion is not universally held by scholars.

Campaigns 

Records indicate that Sevappa was a loyal vassal of the Vijayanagar kings and assisted them in their campaigns. Sevappa was the honorary "betel-bearer" (Adappam in Tamil and Tambula Karandavahin in Sanskrit) of Achyuta Deva Raya.

Reign 

Sevappa's epigraphs are very few and there exist scarcely any record of his reign or campaigns outside the Chola country. One of the earliest events of his reign was the transfer for Tiruchirappalli to the Madurai Nayak kingdom in exchange for Vallam. When the Vijayanagar general Ramaraja Vithala stationed himself and his army in Tiruchirappalli during his wars against the king of Tiruvadi and the Paravas of the south in 1545, Sevappa provided him with men and support.

Grants and public works 

Sevappa constructed a number of Hindu temples, repaired tanks and endowed agraharas. Sevappa repaired the outer walls of the Brihadeeswarar Temple in Thanjavur and ensured regular supply of water to the neighbouring Sivaganga Tank (now within the premises of the Sivaganga Park). In 1572, Sevappa Nayak constructed the gopuraof the Nataraja Temple, Chidambaram and embellished the temples at Thirumala and Srisailam with gold. He also granted seven velis of land to the Samusarupalli mosque near Nanjikottai in 1550 and  a village to the Madhva saint Vijayendra Tirtha in 1574. In 1579, he grant vast lands to the Buddhist temple at Thiruvilandurai.
 
Sevappa also patronized Portuguese merchants. A biography of Francis Xavier from Nagapattinam says that the Portuguese "were greatly favoured by the lord of the country who is a very powerful captain of the king of Bisnaga".

Later life 

In his later days, Sevappa appointed his son Achuthappa Nayak as co-ruler. In about 1563, Sevappa handed over authority in administrative matters to him and concentrated on acts of charity. Sevappa died in 1580 and was succeeded by Achuthappa.

References 

 

Vijayanagara Empire
1580 deaths
Year of birth unknown